Archon apollinus, the false Apollo, is a species of butterfly belonging to the Parnassinae subfamily.

The species is found in Central and Eastern Europe and West Asia. They are found in Greece, Turkey, Iraq, Syria, Jordan, Israel and Lebanon, and like others of the family show considerable variation with four or five subspecies. A morphologically similar species Archon apollinaris has been recently separated and has been found to be sympatric and reproductively isolated.

Older individuals often lose their scales, especially on the forewings, and appear very transparent.

The larvae feed on species of Aristolochia including A. poecilantha, A. parviflora, A. bodamae, A. hirta, A. bottae, A. auricularia, A. rotunda, A. sempervirens, A. maurorum and A. billardieri.

Gallery

Pupa

Footage of false Apollo
Mating and egg deposition
Males fighting and egg deposition

References

 Nazari, Vazrick and Carbonell, Frédéric. 2006. Archon apollinus (Herbst, 1789). Version 7 July 2006 (under construction).  in The Tree of Life Web Project, 

Papilionidae
Butterflies of Europe
Butterflies described in 1789
Taxa named by Johann Friedrich Wilhelm Herbst